Maria Hueber (22 May 165331 July 1705) was a Catholic nun, a pioneer in educating girls in Tyrol and foundress of the Congregation of Tertiary Sisters of Saint Francis in Brixen (Bressanone in Italian).

Hueber founded her congregation in 1701 under the Third Order of Saint Francis.

Early life
Hueber was born to the Brixen tower watchman, Nikolaus Hueber, and his wife Anna Tapp in 1653. Nikolaus died when she was three months old, leaving Anna to bring three children up through her work as a seamstress and by caring for the sick. Anna taught Maria reading, arithmetic, and sewing.

Hueber worked in several residences in Brixen from childhood to supplement her mother's income. She moved to Bolzano, Innsbruck, and then Salzburg in the 1670s, to work in several residences of lay and clergy alike, before her mother's ill health forced her to return home. In the course of her service, she struck acquaintances with many of the religious people she worked for, particularly with the Order of the Servants of Mary in Innsbruck. She corresponded often with several of them.

Religious community
In 1679, she chose to join a lay religious community, the Third Order of St. Francis. She led a cloistered life while also nursing her sick mother. Her mother died in 1696.

Hueber's confessor, Isidor Kirnigl, had come across a community of nuns in Rome who were teaching poor girls. When he suggested that she attempt something similar in Brixen, Hueber - along with her associate Regina Pfurner - started the Order of the Tertiary Sisters of St. Francis and opened a school for girls on 12 September 1700: the first such institution in Tyrol. The girls were taught reading, writing and sewing.

Hueber died in 1705, and was buried in the Church of the Poor Clares in Brixen.

The Order today
The Tertiary Sisters, a community of around 160 in 2019, run the Herz-Jesu-Institut (Institute of the Sacred Heart of Jesus) in Mühlbach, South Tyrol, the Pädagogische Gymnasium in Bolzano and the Marienklinik Hospital in Bolzano. They also engage in missions in Cameroon and Bolivia. The Generalate is in Rome.

Beatification
The process for the beatification of Hueber began in 1996. On 19 March 2019, Pope Francis authorized Cardinal Giovanni Angelo Becciu, prefect of the Congregation for the Causes of Saints to issue the decree of Hueber's heroic virtues.

Further reading
 
 Maria Hueber - Josef Gelmi, pub. Athesia, 1993, 
 Maria Hueber - Josef Gelmi, pub. ECHO, 1995, 
 Maria Hueber - Ekkart Sauser, Biographical Bibliographic Church Lexicon Vol 14, Bautz, Herzberg 1998, Sp. 1097-1098.

References

17th-century venerated Christians
Founders of Catholic religious communities
Leaders of Catholic female orders and societies
Members of the Third Order of Saint Francis
People from Brixen
1653 births
1705 deaths
Venerated Catholics by Pope Francis
Austrian Roman Catholic religious sisters and nuns